This One's For the Fellows is a tribute album of songs originally by the rock band Young Fresh Fellows. It was released in 2004 by BlueDisguise Records. The title refers to the Fellows' album This One's For the Ladies.

Track listing
 Rock & Roll Pest Control - The Presidents of the United States of America
 Love is a Beautiful Thing - The Silos
 How Much About Last Night Do You Remember? - Eric Kassel & Friends
 Mamie Dunn / Good Times Rock'n'Roll - Robyn Hitchcock
 No One Really Knows - The Maroons with Steve Malkmus
 Lost Track Of Time - Carla Torgerson & Amy Stolzenbach
 Get Outta My Cave - Comb-Over
 Still There's Hope - Visqueen
 This One's For the Ladies - The Figgs
 Celebration - John Ramberg & Christy McWilson
 Unimaginable Zero Summer - Johnny Sangster
 Deep, Down & In-Between - The Mendoza Line
 Hillbilly Drummer Girl - I Can Lick Any Sonofabitch In the House
 Take My Brain Away / Teenage Dogs in Trouble - Emily Bishton & Conrad Uno
 Rotation - The Black Panties
 Telephone Tree - Louden Swain
 I Lose Control - Marshall Artist
 99 Girls - The Groovie Ghoulies
 I Hate Everything - Charlie Chesterman & the Legendary Motorbikes
 Don't You Wonder How It Ends? - The Makers
 (hidden track) Teenage Dogs in Trouble - The Mono Men with Scott McCaughey (lead singer/songwriter of the Fellows)

References
 Official page about the album (BlueDisguise Records), includes full credits and other materials.

2004 albums
Tribute albums